Jasper is a  residential skyscraper located at 514 Harrison Street in the Rincon Hill neighborhood of San Francisco, California, United States.  The tower contains 320 residential units on 39 floors.

History
In 2006, Jackson Pacific Ventures entitled the site for a  residential tower with 227 units.  Jackson Pacific then sold the entitlements to Turberry Associates for US$30 million. The groundbreaking was delayed due to the financial crisis of 2007–2008, and in 2010 Crescent Heights purchased the property for US$13 million.

In 2011, Crescent Heights re-entitled the property, changing the number of units from 227 to 320, while keeping the building the same height.  To make room for the new configuration, the number of studios was increased from 3 to 99, one-bedrooms decreased from 111 to 93, two-bedrooms were increased from 77 to 128, and all 36 three-bedrooms were removed. By 2012, Crescent Heights received its building permits, and construction began in 2013.

According to planning documents, the building rises  to the roof line, and the mechanical screening structures account for an additional .  The first residents moved into the building in October 2015.

See also

List of tallest buildings in San Francisco

References

External links
 

Residential condominiums in San Francisco
Residential skyscrapers in San Francisco
South of Market, San Francisco